is a Japanese film and stage actor. He is best known for the role as Tanaka in the Westworld series.

Career
At an early age, Haneda decided to pursue an acting career. From 1999 to 2000, under Yoko Narahashi, he attended the United Performers' Studio (UPS Academy) in Tokyo, where he took part on theatre in stage plays. After graduation he passionately continued his studies with workshops conducted  by teachers of the Actors Studio, New York. In 2003, he was a stunt performer on the 2003 film The Last Samurai.

Haneda has appeared in films such as When the Last Sword Is Drawn (2003), Oh! My Zombie Mermaid (2004), Marebito (2004), Godzilla: Final Wars (2004), and Memories of Matsuko (2006). His international debut started in July 2006, with the joint French–German–Indian independent film Valley of Flowers. In 2008, Haneda appeared in a role in the American–Japanese film The Ramen Girl. In 2012, Haneda had a supporting role as a driver to Matthew Fox's character and interpreter in Emperor. This was followed by a role playing a samurai in 47 Ronin in 2013. In 2014, he was a soldier in Edge of Tomorrow.

Personal life
Haneda met singer-songwriter Hitomi Furuya during a play in 2007. They were married on July 11, 2008. The couple have one child, a daughter, born on December 23, 2008. On December 6, 2011, it was reported that Haneda and Furuya had filed for divorce after it was revealed that they had been living separately for over six months by then.

Filmography

Film

Television

Theatre

References

External links

1976 births
Living people
People from Tokyo
Japanese male film actors
Japanese male stage actors
21st-century Japanese male actors